Umalat Magomedov, also known as Emir Al Bara, was the leader of the militant Vilayat Dagestan organisation in the southern Russian Republic of Dagestan.

Biography
He was appointed emir by Dokka Umarov, leader of the Caucasus Emirate, in April 2009 after the death of Omar Sheikhulayev.  He was killed by Russian security forces on 31 December 2009.

The widow of Umalat Magomedov, a 17-year-old called Dzhanet Abdullayeva (also known as Abdurakhmanova) was one of the two suicide bombers who carried out the 2010 Moscow Metro bombings.

References

External links 
 Ruslan Kurbanov Radicalization of Muslim young people

1979 births
2009 deaths
People from Khasavyurt
Caucasus Emirate members
Russian Islamists
Russian rebels
Leaders of Islamic terror groups